Pasi Schalin (born 8 February 1968) is a Finnish actor, fitness model, personal trainer, retired professional ice hockey player and roller derby skater. He is best remembered as a key skater on TV's RollerJam known as "The Schalin Machine".

Career
Born near Helsinki, Finland, Pasi played professional hockey with several teams in Finland, Germany, the United States and Canada. He was a part of the National Hockey League's Edmonton Oilers organization. Upon retirement, he and then-wife Suzanne moved to the U.S. and both landed spots on The Nashville Network/The New TNN's roller derby revival RollerJam.  Both skated for the Florida Sundogs the first two seasons, then the California Quakes the final two.

After RollerJam ended in 2001, Pasi began focusing on his acting and modeling careers.  He currently resides in Los Angeles and has appeared in several television shows and movies.

Reference links

External links

1968 births
Finnish male actors
Finnish ice hockey forwards
Finnish male models
HIFK (ice hockey) players
Kaufbeurer Adler players
Living people
Maine Mariners players
Nashville Knights players
People from Imatra
Roller derby skaters
San Diego Gulls (WCHL) players
Sportspeople from Helsinki
Tampa Bay Tritons players
Finnish expatriates in the United States